Ștefan C. Hepites (February 1851 – September 1922) was a Romanian physicist and meteorologist.

He was elected a full member of the Romanian Academy in 1902.

Notes

1851 births
1902 deaths
Romanian physicists
Romanian meteorologists
Titular members of the Romanian Academy